Mitchell Alex Chaffee (born January 26, 1998) is an American professional ice hockey right winger currently playing for the Iowa Wild in the American Hockey League (AHL) as a prospect to the Minnesota Wild of the National Hockey League (NHL).

Early life
Chaffee was born on January 26, 1998, in Rockford, Michigan, to parents Dave and Kathy Chaffee. He began skating at the age of four and participated in the local "Learn to Skate" and Triple-A programs in the Grand Rapids. Chaffee then played for the Michigan Nationals U18 team before leaving his hometown at the age of 16 to play with the HoneyBaked Hockey Club.

Playing career
While playing with the HoneyBaked Hockey Club during the 2014–15 season, Chaffee recorded 10 goals and 18 assists for 28 points as they qualified for the USA Hockey National Championship game. As a result of his play with the HoneyBaked Hockey Club, Chaffee was selected to play with the Muskegon Lumberjacks of the United States Hockey League (USHL). However, his playing rights were later traded to the Bloomington Thunder in May 2015. He was also drafted by the Sault Ste. Marie Greyhounds in the 11th round of the 2014 Ontario Hockey League Draft.

In his first year with the Thunder, Chaffee recorded seven goals and six assists for 13 points in 54 games. He subsequently committed to play college hockey at the University of Massachusetts Amherst. During his tenure with the Thunder, Chaffee attended Normal Community West High School and played one season of golf.

Collegiate

Chaffee played college hockey at the University of Massachusetts Amherst. During his sophomore season, he was the Hockey East Scoring Champion and was named to the conference's first All-Star team. He was named as one of the team's co-captains for the 2019–20 season. On March 24, 2020, after his junior season at UMass, Chaffee signed a two-year, entry-level contract with the Minnesota Wild.

Professional
Following the signing of his contract, Chaffee attended the Wild's 2021 training camp prior to the start of the 2020–21 season. He was subsequently re-assigned to their American Hockey League affiliate, the Iowa Wild, for the remainder of the season.

Career statistics

Awards and honors

References

External links
 

1998 births
AHCA Division I men's ice hockey All-Americans
American men's ice hockey right wingers
Fargo Force players
Ice hockey players from Michigan
Iowa Wild players
Living people
UMass Minutemen ice hockey players
Minnesota Wild players
People from Rockford, Michigan
Undrafted National Hockey League players